Prosotas dubiosa, the tailless lineblue or small purple lineblue, is a blue butterfly (Lycaenidae) found in Asia to Australia. The species was first described by Georg Semper in 1879.

Subspecies
The subspecies of Prosotas dubiosa are:

 Prosotas dubiosa dubiosa - Australia
 Prosotas dubiosa eborata Tite, 1963 - Solomon Islands
 Prosotas dubiosa indica (Evans, [1925]) - India
 Prosotas dubiosa lumpura (Corbet, 1938) - Malay Peninsula
 Prosotas dubiosa subardates (Piepers & Snellen, 1918) - Java, Sulawesi

Range
The butterfly occurs in Sri Lanka and peninsular India and the Himalayas from Sikkim to Assam. The range extends onto Myanmar and Yunnan, and, possibly Thailand, Peninsular Malaysia, Singapore, Hong Kong, Sumatra, Borneo and Java. Possibly Philippines and Sulawesi. Further east the butterfly occurs in Australia, New Guinea and the Solomon islands. In Australia the butterfly occurs from Northern Australia to New South Wales (Coffs Harbour).

Gallery

See also
List of butterflies of India (Lycaenidae)

Cited references

References

External links
 With images.

Prosotas
Butterflies of Asia
Butterflies of Singapore
Butterflies of Borneo